Oman Sports TV is an Omani satellite television channel based in Muscat, Oman.The channel was launched in 2008.The Channel owned by Sultanate of Oman Television

See also

Television in Oman

References

External links
 Oman Sports TV Official website
 Oman Sports TV Official Twitter Account

Television in Oman
Arab mass media
Arabic-language television stations
Television channels and stations established in 2008
Arab Spring and the media